Upper Broughton was a railway station serving  Upper Broughton in the English county of Nottinghamshire. It was opened on the Nottingham direct line of the Midland Railway between London and Nottingham, avoiding Leicester. The line still exists today as the Old Dalby Test Track.

History 
The station was opened for passengers on 2 February 1880  by the Midland Railway. The station was designed by the Midland Railway company architect John Holloway Sanders.

It also improved access to and from the iron-ore fields in Leicestershire and Rutland. Local traffic was minimal and Upper Broughton closed to passengers as early as 1948.

Stationmasters
George Linney
Joseph Cowland 1880 - 1893
Andrew John Payne 1893 - 1920
Joseph Hunt 1921 - 1929
Oliver Sabin 1930 - 1936
H. Crompton 1937 - 1939 (also station master at Widmerpool, afterwards station master at Ipstones, Bradnop and Winkhill)
W. Simmonds from 1939 (also station master at Widmerpool)

Present day 

The line was also used for the testing of London Underground 'S stock' trains built by Bombardier transportation.

The main station building on the roadside above the line remains in good condition, incorporated into the garden of the former station master's house, now a private residence.

The site was listed for sale in June 2017, at a price of £745,000. According to the listing, the roadside station building is still remarkably original.

References

External links
 Some views of the station over the years
  Photos of trains at the station over the years
 Upper Broughton station on navigable 1946 O.S. map
 http://www.rightmove.co.uk/property-for-sale/property-60700840.html
Listing of property for sale, June 2017

Disused railway stations in Nottinghamshire
Railway stations in Great Britain opened in 1880
Railway stations in Great Britain closed in 1948
Former Midland Railway stations
John Holloway Sanders railway stations